Face Down (formerly known as Machine God) was a Swedish heavy metal band from Stockholm, originally founded in 1993. They disbanded in 1999 and reformed in 2004. The latest formation consisted of singer Marco Aro (currently of The Resistance and The Haunted), drummer Christofer Barkensjö (formerly of Kaamos and Blackshine), guitarist Rickard Dahlberg (Construcdead), and bassist Joakim Hedestedt. Their final album, The Will to Power, was produced by Jocke Skog and was released in November 2005, entering the Swedish hard rock chart at number 19. The band is currently on an indefinite hiatus.

Members 
Marco Aro – vocals (1993–1999; 2004–2011)
Rickard Dahlberg – guitar (2007–2011)
Joakim Hedestedt – bass (1993–1999; 2004–2011)
Christofer Barkensjö – drums (2006–2011)

Former members 
Alex Linder – guitar (1993–1994)
Niklas Ekstrand – guitar (1994–1995)
Henrik Blomquist – audio warfare  (1994–1996)
Joacim Carlsson – guitar (1994–1999; 2004–2007)
Richard Bång – drums (1993–1995)
Peter Stjärnvind – drums (1995–1997)
Håkan Ericsson – drums (1997–1999)
Erik Thyselius – drums (2004–2006)

Discography 
One Eyed Man (demo, 1994)
Mindfield (1995)
The Twisted Rule the Wicked (1997)
The Will to Power (2005)

References

External links 

Face Down at MySpace

Swedish death metal musical groups
Groove metal musical groups
Musical groups established in 1993
Musical quartets
1993 establishments in Sweden